Phos verbinneni is a species of sea snail, a marine gastropod mollusk in the family Nassariidae, the true whelks and the like.

Distribution
This marine species occurs off the Philippines.

References

  Fraussen K. (2009). A new Antillophos (Gastropoda: Buccinidae) from the Philippines. Gloria Maris, 48(4-5): 99-104 
 Dekkers A.M. & Dekker H. (2020). A new small Phos-like genus and species Microphos palogai (Gastropoda: Nassariidae: Photinae) from the Philippines. Gloria Maris. 59(3): 98-101

Nassariidae
Gastropods described in 2009